Immaan Dharam is a 1977 Bollywood action drama film, written by Salim–Javed (Salim Khan and Javed Akhtar), directed by Desh Mukherjee and produced by Premji. The film stars  Shashi Kapoor, Sanjeev Kumar, Amitabh Bachchan, Rekha, Aparna Sen, Helen and Prem Chopra. The music is by Laxmikant–Pyarelal. The movie did not do well on its release.

Plot 

This is a story about Ahmed and Mohan, who act as mock witnesses and always hang around court to give evidence as per the requirement of a case. This changes when they meet and are influenced by Kabir Das, and decide to go straight. But they soon feel that it's virtually impossible to earn a living as honest citizens. Meanwhile, Kabir Das is arrested for a murder he claims he did not commit, and the duo promise to help him, and find out who the real killer is, but they end up getting in trouble themselves.

Cast

Shashi Kapoor as Mohan Saxena
Amitabh Bachchan as Ahmed Raza
Sanjeev Kumar as Kabir Das
Rekha as Durga
Aparna Sen as Shyamlee
Helen as Jenny Francis
Prem Chopra as Ranjeet
Om Shivpuri as Seth Jamna Das
Shreeram Lagoo as Govinda Anna
Utpal Dutt as Retired Major Balvir Singh
Amrish Puri as Dharam Dayal
A. K. Hangal as Masterji (Shyamlee's Father)
M. B. Shetty as Kargah
Sudhir as Gupta
Raj Kishore as Munshi
C. S. Dubey as Lawyer (Gullu Miya's Case)
Mac Mohan as False Witness
Baby Rani as Pinky Francis
Jagdish Raj as Police Inspector
Satyan Kappu as Prosecuting Lawyer (Jamna Das' Case)
Pinchoo Kapoor as Kabir's Lawyer
Sajjan as Lawyer (Jenny's Case)
Gajanan Jagirdar as Barkat Chacha

Crew

Director - Desh Mukherjee
Writer - Salim–Javed 
Producer - J. N. Manchanda, Premji
Production Company - Suchitra Films Pvt. Ltd.
Editor - Das Dhaimade
Cinematographer - Nariman A. Irani
Art Director - Marutirao V. Kale
Stunts - Kodi S. Irani, M. B. Shetty
Costume and Wardrobe - Dhanji Mistry, Keshav Rao
Choreographer - P. L. Raj
Music Director - Laxmikant–Pyarelal
Lyricist - Anand Bakshi
Playback Singers - Mohammed Rafi, Asha Bhosle, Mahendra Kapoor, Kishore Kumar, Lata Mangeshkar, Mukesh.

Music

References

External links 
 
 

1977 films
1970s Hindi-language films
Films scored by Laxmikant–Pyarelal
Films with screenplays by Salim–Javed
1970s Urdu-language films
Urdu-language Indian films